Dmytro Yesin (born 15 April 1980) is a former professional Ukrainian football midfielder and current football manager. He also holds a Russian passport.

He joined Vorskla Poltava from Illichivets in February 2008.

External links

 Profile on Football Squads

1980 births
Living people
People from Shakhtarsk
Russian footballers
Ukrainian footballers
FC Shakhtar Donetsk players
FC Shakhtar-2 Donetsk players
FC Shakhtar-3 Donetsk players
FC Vorskla Poltava players
FC Mariupol players
Ukrainian Premier League players
Association football midfielders
FSC Mariupol managers
Ukrainian football managers
Sportspeople from Donetsk Oblast